Guilherme Soares Guedes de Freitas (born 24 July 1991), commonly known as Guilherme, is a Brazilian footballer who plays for Tonan Maebashi.

Club career
Guilherme joined Solomon Islands side Marist Fire in 2017, playing in three OFC Champions League games, scoring five goals. He started the season well, with four goals in his first six games. However, he was detained by police along with compatriots Marcelo and Diego in late 2017, as their visas had failed to process. He left Marist and returned to his native Brazil.

Career statistics

Club

Notes

References

External links
 
 

1991 births
Living people
Brazilian footballers
Brazilian expatriate footballers
Association football forwards
Sport Club Internacional players
Canoas Sport Club players
Sociedade Esportiva e Recreativa Caxias do Sul players
Clube Atlético Mineiro players
Montevideo Wanderers F.C. players
Mqabba F.C. players
Al-Shabab SC (Seeb) players
Guarani de Palhoça players
Concórdia Atlético Clube players
Marist F.C. players
SC Sagamihara players
J3 League players
Uruguayan Primera División players
Brazilian expatriate sportspeople in Uruguay
Expatriate footballers in Uruguay
Brazilian expatriate sportspeople in Malta
Expatriate footballers in Malta
Brazilian expatriate sportspeople in Oman
Expatriate footballers in Oman
Expatriate footballers in the Solomon Islands